Bastiaan Zuiderent (born 3 March 1977) is a former Dutch international cricketer. He is a right-handed batsman and a right-arm medium-pace bowler. He is one of very few Dutchmen, to have appeared in six International Cricket Council events.

International career
At the age of 18, Zuiderent was selected in the Netherlands squad for their inaugural appearance at the Cricket World Cup in 1996. In his second World Cup match, he scored 54 against England at Peshawar.

The following year, Zuiderent was selected in the Dutch squad for the 1997 ICC Trophy, but the team was unable to secure qualification for the 1999 Cricket World Cup.

Most notably, he missed the 2001 ICC Trophy competition in which the Netherlands earned qualification for the 2003 Cricket World Cup, but he did later represent his country in all their matches at the 2003 Cricket World Cup.

After leaving Sussex, Zuiderent returned to the Netherlands and once again was a regular member of the national team. In the 2005 ICC Trophy, he scored three centuries and finished as the tournament's top run-scorer. He produced a man of the match performance in the 5th/6th place play-off against the United Arab Emirates, carrying his bat and scoring 116 not out. The win ensured that the Netherlands would qualify for the 2007 Cricket World Cup and receive ICC funding and ODI status for four years. Zuiderent was named as the Player of the Tournament.

In February 2007, Zuiderent was named in the Dutch squad for the 2007 Cricket World Cup.

County career
In 1999, Zuiderent was signed by Sussex County Cricket Club, and played for them up until the end of the 2003 season. During this period, he did not always appear regularly for the Netherlands team as he believed that playing in matches for Sussex would be more beneficial to his career.

References

External links
 
 Bas Zuiderent Interview

1977 births
Living people
Dutch cricketers
Netherlands One Day International cricketers
Netherlands Twenty20 International cricketers
Cricketers at the 1996 Cricket World Cup
Cricketers at the 2003 Cricket World Cup
Cricketers at the 2007 Cricket World Cup
Cricketers at the 2011 Cricket World Cup
Sussex cricketers
Sportspeople from Utrecht (city)